The Chinese elm cultivar Ulmus parvifolia 'Blizzard' arose in 2001 from a sport mutation on a tree growing in the Louisville Gardens, Kentucky. It was cloned at the Mast Arboretum of the Stephen F. Austin State University, Nacogdoches, Texas .

Description
The tree is distinguished primarily by its pale-green and cream-flecked leaves. A relatively new development, the ultimate size and shape of the tree are not known, but juvenile growth is slow, increasing in height at < 35 cm per annum.

Pests and diseases
The species and its cultivars are highly resistant, but not immune, to Dutch elm disease, and unaffected by the elm leaf beetle Xanthogaleruca luteola.

Cultivation
'Blizzard' is not known to have been introduced to Europe or Australasia. It is reputedly easy to propagate from cuttings taken from late spring to summer and placed under mist.

Accessions
None known

References

Chinese elm cultivar
Ulmus articles missing images
Ulmus